Nea Efesos (Greek: Νέα Έφεσος) is a rural settlement of the former Municipality of Dio, which is part of the municipality of Dio-Olympos, in the Pieria regional unit, Central Macedonia, Greece.

Name
The settlement was recently renamed Νέα Έφεσος (New Ephesus), because of the settlement of Greeks from the region of ancient Ephesus as a result of the 1923 Greek-Turkish population exchange.
In 2007 a weather station was installed in the area.

Population
Nea Efesos has 1,564 inhabitants as of 2011.

References

Νέα Έφεσος Πιερίας

Populated places in Pieria (regional unit)